Periplanone B is a pheromone produced by the female American cockroach, Periplaneta americana.  It is a sexual attractant to male cockroaches, especially at short ranges.

History 
The activity of this pheromone was first described in 1952, but it was not until 25 years later that Persoons et al. reported the gross structure of periplanones A and B. The stereochemical configuration and first total synthesis were reported by W. Clark Still's group at Columbia University in 1979.

References 

Insect pheromones
Epoxides
Sesquiterpenes
Spiro compounds
Ketones
Dienes
Oxygen heterocycles
Vinylidene compounds